The bicoid 3′-UTR regulatory element is an mRNA regulatory element that controls the gene expression of the bicoid protein in fruitfly Drosophila melanogaster.

The structured RNA element consists of four domains (denoted as II, III, IV and V) in the 3′UTR of the mRNA.  It is essential for the correct transport and localisation of bicoid mRNA during oocyte and embryo differentiation, which has been studied most thoroughly in the development of Drosophila melanogaster (fruitfly) larvae.

References

External links 
 

Cis-regulatory RNA elements
Animal developmental biology
Drosophila melanogaster genetics